Charles Monsalvo (born May 26, 1990) is a Colombian professional  footballer who plays as a forward for Sport Huancayo.

Career

Club career
In December 2018, Monsalvo left Ararat-Armenia by mutual consent. In February 2020, he then moved to Qatar and signed with Al Kharaitiyat SC.

In December 2019, he returned to Peru and signed with Sport Huancayo, the club he played for in the 2018 season.

References

External links

1990 births
Living people
Association football forwards
People from Santa Marta
Colombian footballers
Colombian expatriate footballers
Deportes Tolima footballers
Envigado F.C. players
Boyacá Chicó F.C. footballers
Rosario Central footballers
Independiente Medellín footballers
Club Celaya footballers
América de Cali footballers
Águilas Doradas Rionegro players
Al Kharaitiyat SC players
FC Ararat-Armenia players
Sport Huancayo footballers
Categoría Primera A players
Qatar Stars League players
Primera Nacional players
Ascenso MX players
Armenian Premier League players
Peruvian Primera División players
Colombian expatriate sportspeople in Argentina
Colombian expatriate sportspeople in Armenia
Colombian expatriate sportspeople in Mexico
Colombian expatriate sportspeople in Qatar
Colombian expatriate sportspeople in Peru
Expatriate footballers in Argentina
Expatriate footballers in Armenia
Expatriate footballers in Mexico
Expatriate footballers in Qatar
Expatriate footballers in Peru
Sportspeople from Magdalena Department